This article is a list of seasons completed by the Philadelphia Eagles, a professional American football franchise based in Philadelphia, Pennsylvania. The Eagles are a member of the National Football Conference (NFC) East division in the National Football League (NFL). This article documents the season-by-season records of the Eagles’ franchise from 1933 to present, including postseason records, as well as league awards for individual players or head coaches. The Philadelphia Eagles won their 500th game on Sunday, October 26, 2009 over the Atlanta Falcons by a score of 27–14. They were the seventh NFL team to accomplish this feat and the first since the San Francisco 49ers defeated the St. Louis Rams in Week 16 of the 2005 NFL season. They are also the first team in the NFC East to accomplish this feat since the Washington Redskins defeated the Jacksonville Jaguars in Week 8 of the 2000 NFL season. As of 2022, the Eagles have never lost a game to the New York Jets (12–0) or the Houston Texans (6–0). Their meeting with the Seattle Seahawks in the 2019 NFC Wild Card playoffs made the Eagles the second team in NFL history (after the Los Angeles Rams) to face every opponent within their own conference in a playoff game at least once.

The Eagles have won four league titles. Three of these were won prior to the start of the Super Bowl era (in 1948, 1949, and 1960). The fourth and most recent championship was won in Super Bowl LII. With this title win over the New England Patriots, the Eagles achieved a unique distinction for the NFC East division: as of 2021, it is the only current division where every team in it (Dallas, Washington, and the NY Giants are the others) has won at least one Super Bowl, and appeared in at least three Super Bowls (no other division has had all its members make multiple Super Bowl appearances).

Season records

* = Current standing

+ = Due to a strike-shortened season in 1982, all teams were ranked by conference instead of division.

References

 
Philadelphia Eagles
seasons